Lee Hyun (Hangul: 이현, born November 8, 1983) is a South Korean singer. He debuted in 2007 as a member of the co-ed vocal group 8Eight, which disbanded in 2014. He was also a member of the disbanded vocal duo Homme from 2010 to 2018. He is currently signed to Big Hit Music as a solo artist.

Career

2007–2014: 8Eight 
Lee joined Big Hit Entertainment as a trainee in 2005 and signed with the company in 2007. That same year, he debuted as part of the co-ed group 8Eight, alongside Baek Chan and Joo Hee. The group released three studio albums between 2007–2009 and two extended plays from 2010–2011. On December 21, 2014, Big Hit announced that Baek and Joo's contracts had expired and further promotional activities for the group had been suspended. The label stated that the members remained friends and did not rule out the possibility of them reuniting in the future. During its seven years in the industry, 8Eight had become one of the top vocal groups in Korea and dominated the coffee house scene. The group's song "Let’s Not Go Crazy" was released on September 9.

On January 31, 2021, Big Hit announced that 8Eight would make a comeback in February with a new commemorative single, composed by "Hitman" Bang and Wonderkid, for "Without A Heart"s 10th anniversary. On February 6, Lee uploaded a new photo of 8Eight to his Twitter account, teasing the impending release. The song was released on February 7 and marked the group's first time singing together in six years since unofficially disbanding.

2009–present: Solo activities 
Lee released his first solo single on September 9, 2009. The first song "30분전" ("30 Minutes Ago") was a duet with Lim Jeong-hee, the third and final song composed by Bang Shi Hyuk for the "Goodbye" trilogy after Baek Ji-young's "총 맞은 것처럼" ("Like Being Hit By a Bullet") and 8Eight's "심장이 없어" ("Without a Heart"). The music video was released the same day as the album, and starred actress Sunwoo Sun. Lee gave the premiere performance "30 Minutes Ago" on Music Bank on August 11, 2009. On November 16, 2009, he participated in the original soundtrack of "천하무적 이평강" ("Invincible Lee Pyung Kang") with the song "천하무적 이평강" ("Breath"). Lee participated in the original soundtrack of "대물" ("Daemul") with the song "왜 나를 울려요" ("Why Make Me Cry"). In 2012, he released his first full solo album called The Healing Echo.

In 2019, Lee appeared on the BTS World: Original Soundtrack, released on June 28, 2019—he performed the single "You Are Here".

In March 2021, Lee renewed his contract with Big Hit and opened a YouTube channel, in celebration of his 14th anniversary with the company. In June, he participated in the soundtrack for season two of Love (ft. Marriage and Divorce), contributing the ballad single "Deep Sadness", which was released on the 26th. The following month, Lee released his first single since the renewal of his contract, "Moon in the Ocean".

2010–2018: Homme 
In 2010, Lee became part of the collaboration duo Homme with Changmin of 2AM. They released the single "I Was Able To Eat Well" featuring Lee Chae-young. Changmin later signed an exclusive contract with Big Hit in 2015. It expired at the end of January 2018, and Big Hit announced on February 1 that Changmin had chosen to leave the company and open his own agency instead. Lee remained with the label as a soloist.

Personal life 
On October 8, 2012, Lee enlisted for mandatory military service. He received five weeks of basic training before serving as an active-duty soldier for 21 months. In January 2013, Lee co-starred in a military musical, The Promise. It was co-produced by the Ministry of National Defense and the Korea Musical Theatre Association in commemoration of the 60th anniversary of the Korean War armistice. The musical ran from January 9–20 at the National Theater of Korea, and co-starred actors Ji Hyun-woo, Kim Mu-yeol, and Jung Tae-woo, as well as singers Leeteuk of Super Junior and Yoon Hak of Supernova.

Discography

Studio albums

Extended plays

Singles

Filmography

Television 
Lee starred in the KBS variety show Let's Go! Dream Team Season 2 from 2010–11. In 2015, he participated in the premiere season of the MBC singing competition program The King of Mask Singer, appearing on episodes 31–32, but was eliminated in the last round by singer Gummy. Lee returned to the show in 2018, appearing on episodes 179–180 with the stage identity "EAGLE". He was the Mask King for four weeks before being eliminated by actress Jang Eun-ah on episode 188 in January 2019.

Web series 
Lee appeared in several episodes of the faux-reality series Muziekwang Company (2021) hosted by the playlist music channel MUPLY on YouTube and the U+Idol Live app. In 2022, he participated in JTBC's Begin Again Open Mic and appeared on the April 10 episode.

Theater

Awards

Notes

References

1983 births
K-pop singers
Living people
21st-century South Korean  male singers
Hybe Corporation artists